Mashiur Rahman (9 July 1924  12 March 1979), also known as Jadu Mia (Man of Magic), was a senior minister, with the rank and status of prime minister in charge of the Ministry of Railways, Roads and Highways of Bangladesh from 29 June 1978 to 12 March 1979.
He was the founder of Bangladesh Jatyiotabadi Dal, the whole process of transition to multi-party democracy was his brainchild. He named the party and the election symbol was given to the party from his party NAP. He also made the formal Declaration of Independence of Bangladesh from his party NAP (there were two major political parties in the then East Pakistan, one National Awami Party, NAP and Awami League), on the 23 March 1971, when Sheikh Mujib was still negotiating for the premiership of Pakistan with the military junta of Pakistan, not giving the formal declaration despite people's determination for a free, independent country.

Early life and education 
Rahman was born on 9 July 1924, in Rangpur, British India (now Khaga Khari Bari village of Dimla Upazila of Nilphamari District, Bangladesh). He started his primary education in his village school, Khaga Khari Bari school, in which he attended up to the 3rd grade. He then continued his study in Coronation High School in Gopalganj. After passing his Entrance Examination from Rani Brindarani High School in Dimla, Rangpur, Mashiur Rahman would go on to pursue his higher education at Dhaka University.

Political career

Pakistan Era (before 1971) 
Rahman was an elected member of National Assembly of Pakistan in 1962 and led the assembly as deputy leader of the opposition. He was arrested in 1963 for his involvement in the anti-government movement.

Before the liberation war, in 1971, Rahman formally declared Bangladesh's independence and called for forming an all-party government at a public gathering at Paltan Maidan on 23 March. He became Abdul Hamid Khan Bhashani's deputy leader in the National Awami Party in the same period.

Bangladesh Era (after 1971)
After Bhashani died in 1976, Rahman became the president of the Bhashani faction of the National Awami Party. And in 1978, when he joined the Jatiyotabadi Front (Nationalist Front) with a huge portion of the National Awami Party (Bhashani), the party was dissolved, and remained so until it was revived after almost three decades in 2006 by his eldest son, Shawfikul Ghaani Shawpan. He was a founding convening committee of the Bangladesh Nationalist Party and instrumental in the founding of the party. In the 1979 General Election, he ran and won in the Rangpur-1 seat becoming a Member of Parliament. Despite plans and Ziaur Rahman's wish to appoint him prime minister, following his sudden death on 12 March 1979, Shah Azizur Rahman was appointed to the office on 15 April 1979.

After the assassination of Sheikh Mujibur Rahman in 1975, the post of Prime Minister of Bangladesh was abolished. When Ziaur Rahman, who came to power in November 1975, became the President of Bangladesh on 21 April 1977, a ministerial system was re-established, and Mashiur Rahman served as a senior minister with the rank and status of prime minister in charge of the Ministry of Railways, Roads and Highways of Bangladesh from 29 June 1978 to 12 March 1979.

Personal life 
Rahman was married to Sabera Mashiur Rahman and Amina Mashiur Rahman. He had 11 children, 5 sons and 6 daughters. His eldest son, Shawfikul Ghaani Shawpan, was a minister in the governments of President Ziaur Rahman and President Hussain Muhammad Ershad, while his eldest daughter, Mansura Mohiuddin, was a two time member of parliament.

Death
Rahman died on 12 March 1979 in office as Senior Minister with the rank and status of Prime Minister. After his death, a three-day state mourning was observed and he was given a state funeral, being buried with full honours including a 19-gun salute. Many foreign dignitaries and heads of state wrote condolence letters after his sudden death, including former US president Jimmy Carter.

References

1924 births
1979 deaths
Bangladesh Nationalist Party politicians
National Awami Party politicians
Bengali Muslims
University of Dhaka alumni
Railways ministers of Bangladesh
Road Transport and Bridges ministers of Bangladesh
Prime Ministers of Bangladesh
Pakistani MNAs 1962–1965
2nd Jatiya Sangsad members
People from Nilphamari District
People from Rangpur District
20th-century Bengalis